Per Ivar Moe (born 11 November 1944, in Ålesund) is a former speed skater from Norway.

Biography
In 1963, 18-year-old Per Ivar Moe won bronze at the European Allround Championships, an achievement he would repeat the following year (1964). In addition, in 1964, he became the first in 8 years to beat Knut Johannesen at the Norwegian Championships. That year, he also participated in the 1964 Winter Olympics in Innsbruck and won a silver medal on the 5,000 m in a time of 7:38.6, a mere 0.2 seconds behind Johannesen. At first, it seemed that Moe had won gold when 7:38.7 was displayed as Johannesen's time, but this was quickly corrected to 7:38.4.

In 1965, Moe won silver at the European Championships and two weeks later he became World Allround Champion. For his achievements, he received the 1965 Oscar Mathisen Award and was elected Norwegian Sportsperson of the Year that same year. Moe retired in 1966 to complete his university degree. Per Ivar Moe was in banking business in his professional life. He was Vice President in Nordea, one of the biggest banks in Norway.

Medals
An overview of medals won by Moe at important championships he participated in, listing the years in which he won each:

Personal records
To put these personal records in perspective, the WR column lists the official world records on the dates that Moe skated his personal records.

Moe was number one on the Adelskalender, the all-time allround speed skating ranking, from 26 January 1964 to 13 February 1965 and for 4 more days in January 1966 – a total of 388 days. He has an Adelskalender score of 177.150 points.

References

Notes

Bibliography

 Eng, Trond. All Time International Championships, Complete Results: 1889 - 2002. Askim, Norway: WSSSA-Skøytenytt, 2002.
 Eng, Trond; Gjerde, Arild and Teigen, Magne. Norsk Skøytestatistikk Gjennom Tidene, Menn/Kvinner, 1999 (6. utgave). Askim/Skedsmokorset/Veggli, Norway: WSSSA-Skøytenytt, 1999.
 Eng, Trond; Gjerde, Arild; Teigen, Magne and Teigen, Thorleiv. Norsk Skøytestatistikk Gjennom Tidene, Menn/Kvinner, 2004 (7. utgave). Askim/Skedsmokorset/Veggli/Hokksund, Norway: WSSSA-Skøytenytt, 2004.
 Eng, Trond and Teigen, Magne. Komplette Resultater fra offisielle Norske Mesterskap på skøyter, 1894 - 2005. Askim/Veggli, Norway: WSSSA-Skøytenytt, 2005.
 Moe, Per Ivar. Ung på isen. Oslo, Norway: Aschehoug, 1965.
 Teigen, Magne. Komplette Resultater Norske Mesterskap På Skøyter, 1887 - 1989: Menn/Kvinner, Senior/Junior. Veggli, Norway: WSSSA-Skøytenytt, 1989.
 Teigen, Magne. Komplette Resultater Internasjonale Mesterskap 1889 - 1989: Menn/Kvinner, Senior/Junior, allround/sprint. Veggli, Norway: WSSSA-Skøytenytt, 1989.

External links
 Per Ivar Moe at SkateResults.com
 Personal records from Jakub Majerski's Speedskating Database
 Evert Stenlund's Adelskalender pages

1944 births
Living people
Norwegian male speed skaters
Olympic speed skaters of Norway
Olympic silver medalists for Norway
Speed skaters at the 1964 Winter Olympics
Olympic medalists in speed skating
Medalists at the 1964 Winter Olympics
World Allround Speed Skating Championships medalists
Sportspeople from Ålesund